is a former Japanese football player. His brother is Kohei Nishino.

References

External links

1984 births
Living people
Ritsumeikan University alumni
Association football people from Hyōgo Prefecture
Japanese footballers
J2 League players
Japan Football League players
Kataller Toyama players
Association football midfielders